Westpark Cemetery is a large cemetery in Johannesburg, South Africa, and is the resting place of some of the country's well-known citizens.  It is a non-denomination designated burial ground, and thus has Christian, Jewish, Muslim and Chinese burial areas. The Jewish section contains a Holocaust Memorial, erected in 1959.

It was opened in 1942, and historically was part of one of Johannesburg's original farms, Farm Waterval, which was purchased in 1887 by two Geldenhuys brothers in the hope of finding gold. While they did not find gold, Louw Geldenhuys employed Boer War veterans to build the Emmarentia Dam, and leased smallholdings with fruit trees.

In 1993, 13 hectares were donated to the city for public recreation and, eventually with the other sections, became the Johannesburg Botanic Gardens, Marks Parks Sports Club and the Westpark Cemetery. Today, the sprawling cemetery is the resting place of thousands of Johannesburg residents, and has separate Chinese, Muslim, Jewish, Christian and SANDF burial areas.  Many ornate gravestones and mausoleums can be found throughout the park.

Westpark is an active cemetery, as burials are still allowed and performed.

Military plot
There are also specific areas for servicemen who have died in the line of duty.  This cemetery contains war graves of 617 Commonwealth service personnel of World War II, mostly burials from military hospitals and an airfield, besides 21 non-Commonwealth war graves and seven non-war graves that are in care of the Commonwealth War Graves Commission.

The Military Plot contains the Johannesburg Cremation Memorial to 69 Commonwealth service personnel cremated at Johannesburg's Braamfontein Crematorium during the same war and is found directly behind the Cross of Sacrifice.

Notable interments 
 Beyers Naudé – Christiaan Frederick Beyers Naudé (1915–2004) was a South African cleric, theologian and the leading Afrikaner anti-apartheid activist.
 Westdene dam disaster – Casualties of the Westdene dam disaster, a bus accident that took place in Westdene, near Johannesburg, South Africa, in 1985.
 Evelyn Mase – midwife nurse and former first wife of Nelson Mandela.
 Jacob Matlala – "Baby Jake" (1962–2013) was a South African boxer and junior flyweight champion from Meadowlands, Johannesburg. 
 Joe Mafela – South African actor, writer, producer, director, singer, and businessman
 Linda Mkhize – ProKid (1981–2018), better known by his stage name ProKid or PRO, was a South African rapper and producer.
 John Nkadimeng – South African politician and anti-Apartheid activist
 Ahmed Kathrada – freedom fighter, struggle icon, Parliamentary Councillor and adviser to President Nelson Mandela
 George Bizos – Greek-South African human rights lawyer
 Nkosi Johnson – Child AIDS activist
 Joe Modise – ANC struggle veteran and Umkhonto we Sizwe commander
 Alfred Nzo – Anti-apartheid struggle veteran
 Brett Goldin – well-known stage and screen actor, who was murdered execution-style with his fashion-designer friend, Richard Bloom
 Harry Heinz Schwarz – lawyer, statesman and long-time political opposition leader against apartheid.
 Herman Charles Bosman – famous South African poet and author
 Simba Mhere (1988–2015) – South African/ Zimbabwean TV Personality
 Cecil Margo – Judge, World War II fighter pilot, DFC, DSO
 Gisele Wulfsohn – South African photographer
 Akhumzi Jezile – South African actor, television presenter and producer
 Arthur Chaskalson – Judge, lawyer to Nelson Mandela
 Johnny Clegg – British-born South African musician and anthropologist
 Johannes van der Walt – South African wrestler known as the 'Gemaskerde Wonder' (Masked Wonder)
 Gert Potgieter (tenor) – South African Tenor and Actor
 Mandoza (1978–2016) – South African kwaito musician
 Vuyo Mbuli – South African television personality and news presenter
 Prudence Nobantu Mabele (1971–2017) – one of first black South African lesbian woman and a leading HIV activist to live openly with HIV.
 Richard Maponya – South African entrepreneur and property developer
 John Moshoeu – South African retired professional footballer.
 Kiernan Jarryd Forbes – (1988–2023) – South African Rapper

References 

1942 establishments in South Africa
Cemeteries in South Africa
Commonwealth War Graves Commission cemeteries in South Africa
Buildings and structures in Johannesburg